Morrissey ridge  is a mountain range of the Border Ranges located south-east of Fernie.

See also
Ranges of the Canadian Rockies

References
BCGNIS entry "Morrissey Ridge"
Canadian Mountain Encyclopedia entry "Morrissey Ridge"

Canadian Rockies